Nako Lake is a high altitude lake in the Pooh sub-division of the Kinnaur district of the state of Himachal Pradesh in India. It forms part of the boundary of Nako village, and is named after it. The lake is surrounded by willow and poplar trees. Near the lake there are four Buddhist temples. Near this place there is a foot-like impression ascribed to the saint Padmasambhava. Several miles away there is a village called Tashigang around which there are several caves where it is believed that Guru Padmasambhava meditated and gave discourse to followers. There is a waterfall nearby which has snow water falling like a river of milk. Legend says that it is a heavenly realm of fairies. In one of the caves you are still able to see the live footprints of these fairies or other demigods. It is a sacred place for the people of these valleys. Followers come from as far a place as Ladhak and spiti valley.

References

External links
 Himachal Pradesh Tourism Department

Lakes of Himachal Pradesh
Geography of Kinnaur district